Sizeva is a rural locality (a village) in Oshibskoye Rural Settlement, Kudymkarsky District, Perm Krai, Russia. The population was 9 as of 2010.

Geography 
Sizeva is located 39 km northeast of Kudymkar (the district's administrative centre) by road. Patrukova is the nearest rural locality.

References 

Rural localities in Kudymkarsky District